Table tennis is among the sports contested at the Summer Olympic Games. It was introduced at the 1988 Summer Olympics in Seoul, South Korea, where singles and doubles tournaments were held for both genders. The doubles events were dropped from the 2008 Summer Olympics program and replaced by team events. The competitions are conducted in accordance with the rules established by the International Table Tennis Federation (ITTF).

Ma Long (China) is the all-time Olympic medal leader, having won five golds. Dimitrij Ovtcharov (Germany) have won six medals in the men's competitions, while Ma Lin and Zhang Jike (China) are the male with three gold medals. Wang Nan (China) is the best-performing athlete in the women's competitions, having won four golds—a figure shared with fellow Chinese players Deng Yaping and Zhang Yining—and one silver medal.  Thirteen players have won four medals and six have won three. Chen Jing competed for China when she won her first two medals in 1988, and for Chinese Taipei when she gained her most recent two medals at the 1996 and 2000 Summer Olympics. Since 1992, the winner of the women's singles has also won the doubles or team event: Deng Yaping, in 1992 and 1996; Wang Nan, in 2000; Zhang Yining, in 2004 and 2008; Li Xiaoxia, in 2012; Ding Ning, in 2016; and Chen Meng, in 2020. In the men's competition, Liu Guoliang (1996), Ma Lin (2008), Zhang Jike (2012), and Ma Long (2016 and 2020) have achieved this feat. Besides Deng, Zhang and Ma Long, no other female or male player has successfully defended their singles title, while in the doubles, back-to-back victories were achieved by Deng Yaping and Qiao Hong (1992, 1996), and Wang Nan (with Li Ju in 2000, and Zhang Yining in 2004).

China has been the most successful nation in Olympic table tennis, winning 60 medals (36 gold, 23 silver, and 8 bronze). Since 1992, Chinese players have won at least one medal in every event. At the 2008 Games, China achieved an unprecedented medal sweep in both the men's and women's singles tournaments, and won both team tournaments. With 18 medals, South Korea is second to China in the overall medal count, and is the only other nation to have won double-digit medals. As of the 2020 Summer Olympics, 115 medals (37 gold, 37 silver, and 41 bronze) have been awarded to 102 players selected from 12 National Olympic Committees (NOC). Third-place matches were not held at the 1992 Summer Olympics, so all losing semifinalists were given bronze medals, resulting in four additional bronze medalists.



Men

Singles

Teams

Women

Singles

Teams

Mixed

Doubles

Discontinued

Men's doubles

Women's doubles

Statistics

Athlete medal leaders

 The years indicate the Olympics at which the medals were won.

Medals per year

Podium sweeps
There has been three podium sweeps in Olympic table tennis history. This is when athletes from one NOC win all three medals in a single event. This has not been possible since the conclusion of the 2008 Olympic games, since following China's podium sweeps, the ITTF has limited each country at the Olympics to a maximum of two contestants per gender.

See also
 World Table Tennis Championships
 Table Tennis World Cup

References
General
 
 
 
 
Specific

Table tennis
medalists

Lists of table tennis players